SINGULART is an online contemporary art and design furniture premium shop based in Paris, France,  and founded in 2017. It caters to painters, photographers, sculptors, furniture designers (since 2022) and has over 10,000 artists.

Google also worked with SINGULART in 2020 as part of its Google Accelerator.

History
SINGULART was founded in 2017 by Denis Fayolle, Brice Lecompte, and Vera Kempf with the mission to empower artists all over the globe.

Prior to founding SINGULART, Kempf had developed a pastry restaurant known as the Carré Paris.

In March 2021, SINGULART curated a collection of art pieces inspired by the COVID-19 pandemic. SINGULART also organized "Les Singulières," a week of events highlighting women in art in honor of International Women's Day, in March 2021.

The online shop has exhibited works by artists such as Julia Bright, Andre Schulze, Alisha Marie Anglin, and Ruslan Khais. They also distribute works by artists such as Hong Kong-based artist Michael Andrew Law. Marion Sailhen is currently the gallery's head curator.

SINGULART was featured in the sixth episode of the documentary series Deal, produced by Maddyness and DocuSign.  

In 2022, SINGULART launched a design furniture section to support and empower designers as well.

Artists 
Some of the well-known artists on SINGULART include:

 Dimitri Likissas
 Stefan Szczesny
 Tomi Ungerer
Wolfgang Neumann
Nanna Hänninen
Pavel Wolberg
Alfred Freddy Krupa
Richard Caldicott
 Claude-Max Lochu

References

External links

Virtual art museums and galleries
Art museums and galleries in Paris
Contemporary art galleries in France